Crazy Jones is a 2002 American comedy-drama film written, produced, and directed by Joe Aaron (in his directorial debut), who also stars with Francesca Catalano.

Synopsis
Finnegan Jones, a suicidal grave-tender suffering from Tourette's syndrome, lives with his overprotective mother and preparing to turn 40. Convinced he'll need a caretaker after she's gone, Jones' mother sets about seeking a prospective spouse. Her candidate—a bubbly, corpulent neighbor whose insensitivity to Finnegan's condition only aggravates the malady—couldn't be worse. Instead, he's begun to bond with a quirky, precocious 12-year-old named Syd, whose refusal to pass judgment allows Finnegan to find his own voice. The friendship never advances beyond the purely platonic, though Syd is a remarkably assured and fitting counterpart Finnegan.

Cast
 Joe Aaron as Finnegan Jones
  Francesca Catalano as Syd
 Elizabeth Ince as Finn's Mom
 Tess Borden as Mandy
 Oto Brezina as Dr. Amp
 Jim O’Donoghue as Pastor McEwen
 Camilla Granasen as Isabel
 Adam O’Neal as Scooter Boy

Reception
Santa Maria Times:

"Joe Aaron's new film, Crazy Jones, will undoubtedly be one of the high points of this year's Santa Barbara International Film Festival. Despite dark undertones, Jones emerges as an uplifting tale of rebirth and redemption, with some wonderful acting at its core...Aaron's modern-day fable mixes tragedy in with absurd humor to great effect...Aaron is a talent worthy of notice, and one that we will hopefully be seeing much more of in the future." -Ken Miller

The Hollywood Reporter:

Aaron and Catalano "make an impressive feature debut...[with] oddball charm and lively performances to match[,] the low-budget picture might scare away distributors looking for a safe bet, but it should still serve as a conspicuous calling card for its multifaceted creator." -Michael Rechtshaffen

Boxoffice Magazine:

"lead/director/screenwriter/producer Joe Aaron has made a passionately felt picture in which his multi-hyphenate involvement does not dissipate the results but deepens them...Aaron's great achievement here in this sparely produced tale, which had its world premiere at the Santa Barbara fest, is that "Crazy Jones" never takes on a movie-of-the-week feel; it's nothing so glossy, and nothing of that ilk...Aaron has crafted an internally consistent story whose conclusion almost gives "Crazy Jones" its own special spirituality." -Kim Williamson

Variety:

"[This] Generally pleasing item could turn up on cable or in niche venues, and regardless will serve as a proud calling card for helmer-scribe Joe Aaron...[who] demonstrates an eye for composition and framing that well exceeds that of most first-time filmmakers." - Lowenstein

Awards
Winner of Cinequest Best Feature Audience Choice Award in 2003.  
Winner of Best Feature Berkeley Film Festival in 2002.  
Award-winner Dances With Films Festival (Los Angeles). 
Award-winner Ft. Myers Film Festival in 2002.  
Official Entry of the Santa Barbara International Film Festival in 2002.

References

External links
 
 
 Santa Maria Times

2002 films
2002 comedy-drama films
2002 directorial debut films
2000s American films
2000s English-language films
American comedy-drama films
Films about Tourette syndrome
Films scored by Jeff Beal
Films shot in Los Angeles